Azzano is a hamlet in central Umbria, a frazione of Spoleto (Province of Perugia) in the upper floodplain of the Clitunno River, at 229 m above sea-level; its population is about 100. Traces of the ancient Roman Via Flaminia can still be made out near the village, the chief monuments of which are the three medieval churches of S. Maria, S. Paolo, and S. Lorenzo.

External links

Thayer's Gazetteer of Umbria: Azzano

Frazioni of the Province of Perugia
Spoleto